Stanislav Hudec (born June 3, 1982) is a Slovak professional ice hockey defenceman. He is currently a free agent having last played for HSC Csíkszereda of the Erste Liga and the Romanian Hockey League.

Hudec played in the Czech Extraliga for HC Vítkovice,  HC Plzeň, HC Sparta Praha, Motor České Budějovice, HC Oceláři Třinec and HC Dynamo Pardubice. He also played in the Slovak Extraliga for MHC Martin, HC Slovan Bratislava, HK Nitra and MsHK Žilina.

Career statistics

References

External links

1982 births
Living people
EHC Basel players
Motor České Budějovice players
Chicoutimi Saguenéens (QMJHL) players
SG Cortina players
HSC Csíkszereda players
Dragons de Rouen players
Dunaújvárosi Acélbikák players
HC Dynamo Pardubice players
MHC Martin players
HK Nitra players
HC Oceláři Třinec players
HC Plzeň players
KH Sanok players
ŠHK 37 Piešťany players
Slovak ice hockey defencemen
HC Slovan Bratislava players
HC Sparta Praha players
Sportspeople from Nitra
HC Vítkovice players
HC Vityaz players
MsHK Žilina players
Slovak expatriate sportspeople in Romania
Expatriate ice hockey players in Romania
Slovak expatriate ice hockey players in Canada
Slovak expatriate sportspeople in France
Expatriate ice hockey players in France
Slovak expatriate ice hockey players in Switzerland
Slovak expatriate ice hockey players in the Czech Republic
Slovak expatriate sportspeople in Hungary
Expatriate ice hockey players in Hungary
Slovak expatriate sportspeople in Italy
Expatriate ice hockey players in Italy
Slovak expatriate sportspeople in Poland
Slovak expatriate ice hockey players in Germany
Slovak expatriate ice hockey players in Russia